Sid Williams is a former Australian rugby league footballer who played in the 1960s and 1970s. In September 1967, Sid played halfback in the Bob Fulton Captain/Coached City side that lost to Country 16 - 12. This was the second City v Country fixture for the season, and was played to determine final selections for the 1967 Kangaroo tour. He is best remembered as the only try scorer in Balmain's 1969 winning Grand Final team.

Playing career
Williams played five seasons with Balmain between 1966-1970. He is remembered as the replacement for George Reubner in the 1969 Grand Final, and scored the try that won the match for the Balmain club over South Sydney 11-2. Williams shifted to Eastern Suburbs for one season in 1971 before retiring. 
Sid was a popular member of staff at Sydney Council Council, now known as Ausgrid, and was portrayed as a character, a Media and Communications Advisor, in the Netflix Series Rake starring Richard Roxsburgh.

References

1944 births
Living people
Balmain Tigers players
Sydney Roosters players
Australian rugby league players
Rugby league wingers
Rugby league players from Sydney